The 2005 Toronto Blue Jays season was the franchise's 29th season in Major League Baseball. It resulted in the Blue Jays finishing third in the American League East with a record of 80 wins and 82 losses. This was the first 162-game season since 1993 that Blue Jays hitters would combine for less than 1,000 strikeouts.

Offseason
January 6, 2005: Ken Huckaby was signed as a free agent with the Toronto Blue Jays.
January 10, 2005: Billy Koch was signed as a free agent with the Toronto Blue Jays.

Regular season

Summary
On February 2, 2005, several days after finalizing the purchase of SkyDome by Rogers Communications, Rogers renamed the stadium to the Rogers Centre. In spite of the best efforts of the new ownership, a wide majority of Blue Jays fans continued (and still continue) to refer to the stadium as SkyDome. By the start of the season, Rogers had upgraded the stadium with a new "JumboTron" videoboard and added other state-of-the-art video screens around the stadium. Furthermore, the AstroTurf surface was replaced by the more natural-looking FieldTurf. Owner Ted Rogers also promised a payroll increase to $210 million over the next three years, which allowed the team to have a team payroll of $70 million per year.

The Blue Jays finished spring training with a 16–10 record. Among the stars of spring training was Gabe Gross, who tied the Jays' record for most home runs in spring training with eight (the previous record breaker was long time Blue Jay Carlos Delgado). The Jays were able to translate their success in spring training into an excellent start—the team led the AL East from early to mid-April and held their record around .500 until late August. The Jays were hit with the injury bug when third baseman Corey Koskie broke his finger, taking him out of the lineup, but the club was pleasantly surprised with the performance of rookie call-up Aaron Hill in his stead.

On July 8, just prior to the All-Star break, Blue Jays ace Roy Halladay was struck on the shin by a line drive from Texas left fielder Kevin Mench and was placed on the DL with a fractured leg. The injury cost Halladay his chance to be the American League starter in the All-Star Game in Detroit; his place on the All-Star squad was taken by Red Sox pitcher Matt Clement. Though Halladay's injury was hoped to be minor, the recovery process was met with constant delays, and Halladay eventually would prove to be out for the rest of the season. Team management officially announced that he would miss the rest of the season in August. The Halladay injury is seen by many as the negative turning point in the Jays season; the team had been in serious wild card contention at the time, but afterwards fell out of the race and failed to make the playoffs for the 12th consecutive year.

On July 22, Toronto traded utility infielder John McDonald to the Detroit Tigers for cash considerations. This gave the Blue Jays an open spot on the roster so that Aaron Hill could stay with the team when Corey Koskie returned from injury.

On July 28, Toronto played in the longest game in franchise history, innings-wise, an 18-inning marathon against the Los Angeles Angels of Anaheim at Rogers Centre. The Jays won 2–1, after nearly five hours of play when Orlando Hudson hit a line drive past a drawn in infield, scoring Alex Ríos from third base.

The shutdown of Halladay for the remainder of the season seemed to affect the performance of the Jays. They went on a slump that brought their record under .500 in the beginning of September. From there, the Blue Jays finished the season 80–82 while receiving glimpses of the future from September call-ups Guillermo Quiróz, John-Ford Griffin, and Shaun Marcum. Marcum made himself noteworthy by posting an ERA of 0.00 over 5 relief appearances and 8 innings in September. Griffin hit his first career home run in the last game of the season and ended up going 4 for 13.

Josh Towers also stepped up, showing largely unseen potential going 7–5 with a 2.91 ERA in the 2nd half of the year and a 13–12, 3.71 ERA season overall, making him arguably the unlikely ace of the Jays rotation with Halladay injured and Gustavo Chacín faltering somewhat after the All-Star break.

The 2005 Jays inability to score with men in scoring position was a turning point in many games that ended up as losses, also contributing to the 80–82 record, although as a positive, the team did improve by 13 wins and returned to their usual 80-win plateau.

On October 9, the Jays, along with their fans, mourned the loss of inaugural broadcaster Tom Cheek. Cheek, 66, succumbed to brain cancer after just over a year-long battle. Cheek had broadcast 4,306 consecutive games since the first day of the franchise. His streak was ended in June 2004 when he took time off to visit his ailing father.

In the off-season, general manager J. P. Ricciardi began to make good use of the money that had been granted to the Jays by Rogers Communications before the season. Rogers had given Ricciardi $210 million over three years, which became $75 million a season to spend, $25 million more than the previous year. Ricciardi fulfilled the team's need for a stable closer by signing former Baltimore Orioles standout B. J. Ryan to the richest contract ever for a reliever – a 5-year, $47 million on November 28. Following that, the club awarded a 5-year, $55 million contract to highly coveted starting pitcher A. J. Burnett, formerly of the Florida Marlins, on December 6.

On December 23, 2005, Rogers Sportsnet reported that the Jays added a much needed 30 plus home run hitter to their lineup by getting third baseman and 2002 World Series MVP Troy Glaus and minor league shortstop Sergio Santos in a trade with the Arizona Diamondbacks. In return, the Diamondbacks received second baseman and 2005 Gold Glove Award winner Orlando Hudson and pitcher Miguel Batista. Glaus passed a team physical on December 26, and the trade was officially announced the next day. On the same day as the announcement of the Glaus deal, the Jays acquired solid-hitting first baseman Lyle Overbay and right-handed pitching prospect Ty Taubenheim in a trade with the Milwaukee Brewers; with pitcher Dave Bush, pitching prospect Zach Jackson, and outfielder Gabe Gross going to Milwaukee. Glaus and Overbay were both introduced to the Toronto media together a few days later.

Season standings

Record vs. opponents

Notable transactions
August 26, 2005: Ken Huckaby was released by the Toronto Blue Jays.

2005 Draft picks
Source 

The 2005 MLB Draft was held on June 7–8.

Roster

Game log

|- align="center" bgcolor="bbffbb"
| 1 || April 4 || @ Devil Rays || 5 – 2 || Halladay (1-0) || Brazelton (0-1) || Batista (1) || 26,018 || 1-0
|- align="center" bgcolor="bbffbb"
| 2 || April 5 || @ Devil Rays || 6 – 3 || Chacín (1-0) || McClung (0-1) || Batista (2) || 9,144 || 2-0
|- align="center" bgcolor="ffbbbb"
| 3 || April 6 || @ Devil Rays || 8 – 5 || Báez (1-0) || Schoeneweis (0-1) || || 8,764 || 2-1
|- align="center" bgcolor="ffbbbb"
| 4 || April 8 || Red Sox || 6 – 5 || Arroyo (1-0) || Bush (0-1) || Foulke (1) || 50,560 || 2-2
|- align="center" bgcolor="bbffbb"
| 5 || April 9 || Red Sox || 12 – 5 || Frasor (1-0) || Wells (0-2) || || 28,765 || 3-2
|- align="center" bgcolor="bbffbb"
| 6 || April 10 || Red Sox || 4 – 3 || Batista (1-0) || Timlin (1-1) || || 22,845 || 4-2
|- align="center" bgcolor="bbffbb"
| 7 || April 11 || @ Athletics || 10 – 3 || Chacín (2-0) || Saarloos (1-1) || || 44,815 || 5-2
|- align="center" bgcolor="bbffbb"
| 8 || April 12 || @ Athletics || 5 – 2 || Towers (1-0) || Haren (0-1) || Batista (3) || 10,106 || 6-2
|- align="center" bgcolor="ffbbbb"
| 9 || April 13 || @ Athletics || 6 – 3 || Calero (1-0) || Frasor (1-1) || || 15,860 || 6-3
|- align="center" bgcolor="bbffbb"
| 10 || April 14 || @ Rangers || 2 – 1 || Halladay (2-0) || Astacio (0-1) || || 19,366 || 7-3
|- align="center" bgcolor="ffbbbb"
| 11 || April 15 || @ Rangers || 4 – 2 || Drese (1-1) || Lilly (0-1) || Cordero (4) || 30,453 || 7-4
|- align="center" bgcolor="bbffbb"
| 12 || April 16 || @ Rangers || 8 – 0 || Chacín (3-0) || Rogers (0-1) || || 40,499 || 8-4
|- align="center" bgcolor="ffbbbb"
| 13 || April 17 || @ Rangers || 6 – 5 || Young (1-1) || Towers (1-1) || Cordero (5) || 31,310 || 8-5
|- align="center" bgcolor="ffbbbb"
| 14 || April 18 || @ Red Sox || 12 – 7 || Schilling (1-1) || Bush (0-2) || || 35,243 || 8-6
|- align="center" bgcolor="bbffbb"
| 15 || April 19 || @ Red Sox || 4 – 3 || Halladay (3-0) || Foulke (1-2) || Batista (4) || 35,598 || 9-6
|- align="center" bgcolor="ffbbbb"
| 16 || April 20 || Yankees || 11 – 2 || Pavano (1-2) || Lilly (0-2) || || 22,838 || 9-7
|- align="center" bgcolor="ffbbbb"
| 17 || April 21 || Yankees || 4 – 3 || Mussina (1-1) || Chacín (3-1) || Rivera (3) || 23,178 || 9-8
|- align="center" bgcolor="ffbbbb"
| 18 || April 22 || Orioles || 13 – 5 || Williams (2-0) || Speier (0-1) || || 18,095 || 9-9
|- align="center" bgcolor="ffbbbb"
| 19 || April 23 || Orioles || 4 – 1 || Bédard (1-1) || Bush (0-3) || || 20,051 || 9-10
|- align="center" bgcolor="ffbbbb"
| 20 || April 24 || Orioles || 7 – 1 || Ponson (3-1) || Halladay (3-1) || || 20,566 || 9-11
|- align="center" bgcolor="bbffbb"
| 21 || April 26 || Devil Rays || 7 – 5 || Lilly (1-2) || Brazelton (1-4) || Batista (5) || 16,690 || 10-11
|- align="center" bgcolor="bbffbb"
| 22 || April 27 || Devil Rays || 8 – 2 || Chacín (4-1) || Kazmir (0-2) || || 19,527 || 11-11
|- align="center" bgcolor="bbffbb"
| 23 || April 28 || Devil Rays || 7 – 4 || Towers (2-1) || Waechter (0-1) || Batista (6) || 21,409 || 12-11
|- align="center" bgcolor="bbffbb"
| 24 || April 29 || @ Yankees || 2 – 0 || Halladay (4-1) || Johnson (2-2) || || 40,839 || 13-11
|- align="center" bgcolor="ffbbbb"
| 25 || April 30 || @ Yankees || 4 – 3 || Rivera (2-1) || Chulk (0-1) || || 47,483 || 13-12
|-

|- align="center" bgcolor="bbffbb"
| 26 || May 1 || @ Yankees || 8 – 6 || Walker (1-0) || Stanton (0-1) || Batista (7) || 54,224 || 14-12
|- align="center" bgcolor="bbffbb"
| 27 || May 2 || @ Orioles || 6 – 2 (12)|| Schoeneweis (1-1) || Williams (3-1) || || 15,641 || 15-12
|- align="center" bgcolor="bbffbb"
| 28 || May 3 || @ Orioles || 1 – 0 || Towers (3-1) || Cabrera (1-2) || Batista (8) || 17,934 || 16-12
|- align="center" bgcolor="ffbbbb"
| 29 || May 4 || @ Orioles || 5 – 1 || Bédard (3-1) || Halladay (4-2) || || 17,645 || 16-13
|- align="center" bgcolor="ffbbbb"
| 30 || May 6 || White Sox || 5 – 3 || Hernández (4-1) || Frasor (1-2) || Hermanson (5) || 21,769 || 16-14
|- align="center" bgcolor="ffbbbb"
| 31 || May 7 || White Sox || 10 – 7 || Garland (6-0) || Lilly (1-3) || || 23,078 || 16-15
|- align="center" bgcolor="ffbbbb"
| 32 || May 8 || White Sox || 5 – 4 || Buehrle (5-1) || Chacín (4-2) || Marte (2) || 20,946 || 16-16
|- align="center" bgcolor="bbffbb"
| 33 || May 9 || Royals || 6 – 1 || Towers (4-1) || Hernández (1-5) || || 13,839 || 17-16
|- align="center" bgcolor="bbffbb"
| 34 || May 10 || Royals || 3 – 1 || Halladay (5-2) || Greinke (0-4) || || 20,123 || 18-16
|- align="center" bgcolor="bbffbb"
| 35 || May 11 || Royals || 12 – 9 || Batista (2-0) || Burgos (1-2) || || 24,402 || 19-16
|- align="center" bgcolor="ffbbbb"
| 36 || May 13 || @ Indians || 6 – 4 || Davis (2-1) || Lilly (1-4) || Wickman (10) || 19,637 || 19-17
|- align="center" bgcolor="ffbbbb"
| 37 || May 14 || @ Indians || 3 – 2 || Rhodes (2-1) || Frasor (1-3) || Wickman (11) || 22,525 || 19-18
|- align="center" bgcolor="bbffbb"
| 38 || May 15 || @ Indians || 5 – 2 || Halladay (6-2) || Sabathia (2-3) || || 23,446 || 20-18
|- align="center" bgcolor="bbffbb"
| 39 || May 17 || @ Twins || 10 – 3 || Towers (5-1) || Santana (5-2) || || 18,717 || 21-18
|- align="center" bgcolor="ffbbbb"
| 40 || May 18 || @ Twins || 3 – 2 || Lohse (3-2) || Bush (0-4) || Nathan (12) || 23,929 || 21-19
|- align="center" bgcolor="ffbbbb"
| 41 || May 19 || @ Twins || 4 – 0 || Mays (3-1) || Chacín (4-3) || || 22,680 || 21-20
|- align="center" bgcolor="bbffbb"
| 42 || May 20 || Nationals || 6 – 1 || Lilly (2-4) || Vargas (0-2) || Walker (1) || 17,465 || 22-20
|- align="center" bgcolor="bbffbb"
| 43 || May 21 || Nationals || 7 – 0 || Halladay (7-2) || Armas (1-2) || || 24,518 || 23-20
|- align="center" bgcolor="ffbbbb"
| 44 || May 22 || Nationals || 9 – 2 || Ohka (3-3) || Towers (5-2) || || 28,408 || 23-21
|- align="center" bgcolor="bbffbb"
| 45 || May 24 || Red Sox || 9 – 6 || Batista (3-0) || Embree (1-2) || || 34,280 || 24-21
|- align="center" bgcolor="bbffbb"
| 46 || May 25 || Red Sox || 6 – 1 || Lilly (3-4) || Arroyo (4-1) || || 23,221 || 25-21
|- align="center" bgcolor="bbffbb"
| 47 || May 26 || Red Sox || 8 – 1 || Chacín (5-3) || Miller (1-1) || Walker (2) || 26,255 || 26-21
|- align="center" bgcolor="ffbbbb"
| 48 || May 27 || Twins || 7 – 2 || Santana (6-2) || Towers (5-3) || || 18,702 || 26-22
|- align="center" bgcolor="ffbbbb"
| 49 || May 28 || Twins || 4 – 3 || Lohse (4-3) || Bush (0-5) || Nathan (15) || 29,263 || 26-23
|- align="center" bgcolor="bbffbb"
| 50 || May 29 || Twins || 4 – 0 || Halladay (8-2) || Mays (3-2) || || 24,287 || 27-23
|- align="center" bgcolor="ffbbbb"
| 51 || May 30 || @ Mariners || 4 – 3 || Moyer (5-2) || Lilly (3-5) || Guardado (14) || 25,540 || 27-24
|- align="center" bgcolor="bbffbb"
| 52 || May 31 || @ Mariners || 9 – 7 || Gaudin (1-0) || Franklin (2-7) || Batista (9) || 25,737 || 28-24
|-

|- align="center" bgcolor="ffbbbb"
| 53 || June 1 || @ Mariners || 3 – 0 || Meche (5-3) || Chacín (5-4) || Guardado (15) || 24,815 || 28-25
|- align="center" bgcolor="ffbbbb"
| 54 || June 2 || @ Athletics || 5 – 3 || Saarloos (2-4) || Towers (5-4) || Street (1) || 10,637 || 28-26
|- align="center" bgcolor="bbffbb"
| 55 || June 3 || @ Athletics || 6 – 2 || Halladay (9-2) || Glynn (0-1) || || 12,332 || 29-26
|- align="center" bgcolor="ffbbbb"
| 56 || June 4 || @ Athletics || 5 – 2 || Blanton (1-5) || Lilly (3-6) || Street (2) || 25,273 || 29-27
|- align="center" bgcolor="ffbbbb"
| 57 || June 5 || @ Athletics || 12 – 4 || Haren (3-7) || Gaudin (1-1) || || 28,754 || 29-28
|- align="center" bgcolor="bbffbb"
| 58 || June 6 || @ Cubs || 4 – 1 || Chacín (6-4) || Koronka (1-1) || Batista (10) || 38,807 || 30-28
|- align="center" bgcolor="bbffbb"
| 59 || June 7 || @ Cubs || 6 – 4 || Schoeneweis (2-1) || Wellemeyer (1-1) || Batista (11) || 39,159 || 31-28
|- align="center" bgcolor="ffbbbb"
| 60 || June 8 || @ Cubs || 2 – 0 || Mitre (1-1) || Halladay (9-3) || Dempster (7) || 38,086 || 31-29
|- align="center" bgcolor="ffbbbb"
| 61 || June 10 || @ Astros || 4 – 2 || Rodríguez (2-2) || Lilly (3-7) || Lidge (16) || 28,607 || 31-30
|- align="center" bgcolor="ffbbbb"
| 62 || June 11 || @ Astros || 6 – 3 || Lidge (2-2) || Schoeneweis (2-2) || || 34,925 || 31-31
|- align="center" bgcolor="ffbbbb"
| 63 || June 12 || @ Astros || 3 – 0 || Oswalt (7-7) || Towers (5-5) || || 30,584 || 31-32
|- align="center" bgcolor="bbffbb"
| 64 || June 13 || Cardinals || 4 – 1 || Halladay (10-3) || Suppan (5-6) || || 20,032 || 32-32
|- align="center" bgcolor="ffbbbb"
| 65 || June 14 || Cardinals || 7 – 0 || Carpenter (9-4) || Gaudin (1-2) || || 37,536 || 32-33
|- align="center" bgcolor="bbffbb"
| 66 || June 15 || Cardinals || 5 – 2 || Lilly (4-7) || Marquis (8-4) || Batista (12) || 22,905 || 33-33
|- align="center" bgcolor="bbffbb"
| 67 || June 17 || Brewers || 9 – 5 || Walker (2-0) || Davis (8-6) || || 17,615 || 34-33
|- align="center" bgcolor="ffbbbb"
| 68 || June 18 || Brewers || 5 – 2 || Sheets (3-6) || Halladay (10-4) || Phelps (1) || 25,264 || 34-34
|- align="center" bgcolor="ffbbbb"
| 69 || June 19 || Brewers || 5 – 2 || Capuano (6-6) || Towers (5-6) || Turnbow (11) || 30,480 || 34-35
|- align="center" bgcolor="bbffbb"
| 70 || June 20 || Orioles || 11 – 2 || Lilly (5-7) || Chen (6-5) || || 15,849 || 35-35
|- align="center" bgcolor="ffbbbb"
| 71 || June 21 || Orioles || 9 – 5 || López (7-2) || Chacín (6-5) || || 17,884 || 35-36
|- align="center" bgcolor="bbffbb"
| 72 || June 22 || Orioles || 3 – 2 || Walker (3-0) || Cabrera (5-7) || Batista (13) || 20,617 || 36-36
|- align="center" bgcolor="bbffbb"
| 73 || June 23 || Orioles || 6 – 2 || Halladay (11-4) || Ponson (7-5) || || 22,390 || 37-36
|- align="center" bgcolor="ffbbbb"
| 74 || June 24 || @ Nationals || 3 – 0 || Loaiza (3-5) || Towers (5-7) || Cordero (24) || 36,689 || 37-37
|- align="center" bgcolor="ffbbbb"
| 75 || June 25 || @ Nationals || 5 – 2 || Hernández (11-2) || Lilly (5-8) || Cordero (25) || 39,881 || 37-38
|- align="center" bgcolor="bbffbb"
| 76 || June 26 || @ Nationals || 9 – 5 || Speier (1-1) || Ayala (6-4) || Batista (14) || 33,557 || 38-38
|- align="center" bgcolor="ffbbbb"
| 77 || June 27 || @ Devil Rays || 4 – 3 || Nomo (5-6) || Walker (3-1) || Báez (13) || 8,779 || 38-39
|- align="center" bgcolor="bbffbb"
| 78 || June 28 || @ Devil Rays || 3 – 1 (11)|| Batista (4-0) || Waechter (3-6) || || 8,545 || 39-39
|- align="center" bgcolor="bbffbb"
| 79 || June 29 || @ Devil Rays || 12 – 3 || Towers (6-7) || Hendrickson (3-5) || || 20,267 || 40-39
|-

|- align="center" bgcolor="bbffbb"
| 80 || July 1 || @ Red Sox || 15 – 2 || Lilly (6-8) || Clement (9-2) || || 35,302 || 41-39
|- align="center" bgcolor="ffbbbb"
| 81 || July 2 || @ Red Sox || 6 – 4 || Timlin (3-1) || Walker (3-2) || Foulke (15) || 35,268 || 41-40
|- align="center" bgcolor="bbffbb"
| 82 || July 3 || @ Red Sox || 5 – 2 || Halladay (12-4) || Arroyo (6-5) || Schoeneweis (1) || 34,794 || 42-40
|- align="center" bgcolor="ffbbbb"
| 83 || July 5 || Athletics || 10 – 7 (11)|| Duchscherer (4-1) || Batista (4-1) || || 21,667 || 42-41
|- align="center" bgcolor="bbffbb"
| 84 || July 6 || Athletics || 8 – 0 || Lilly (7-8) || Blanton (5-7) || || 21,208 || 43-41
|- align="center" bgcolor="bbffbb"
| 85 || July 7 || Athletics || 4 – 2 || Chacín (7-5) || Harden (5-4) || Batista (15) || 22,339 || 44-41
|- align="center" bgcolor="ffbbbb"
| 86 || July 8 || @ Rangers || 7 – 6 || Cordero (1-1) || Batista (4-2) || || 30,242 || 44-42
|- align="center" bgcolor="ffbbbb"
| 87 || July 9 || @ Rangers || 12 – 10 || Rogers (10-4) || Downs (0-1) || Cordero (20) || 36,285 || 44-43
|- align="center" bgcolor="ffbbbb"
| 88 || July 10 || @ Rangers || 9 – 8 || Loe (3-1) || Frasor (1-4) || || 25,767 || 44-44
|- align="center" bgcolor="ffbbbb"
| 89 || July 14 || Devil Rays || 3 – 0 || Fossum (4-7) || Lilly (7-9) || Báez (14) || 20,010 || 44-45
|- align="center" bgcolor="bbffbb"
| 90 || July 15 || Devil Rays || 11 – 6 || Chacín (8-5) || Nomo (5-8) || || 20,841 || 45-45
|- align="center" bgcolor="ffbbbb"
| 91 || July 16 || Devil Rays || 6 – 5 || Hendrickson (4-6) || Towers (6-8) || Báez (15) || 24,801 || 45-46
|- align="center" bgcolor="ffbbbb"
| 92 || July 17 || Devil Rays || 5 – 4 || Orvella (1-1) || Batista (4-3) || Báez (16) || 25,198 || 45-47
|- align="center" bgcolor="bbffbb"
| 93 || July 19 || Mariners || 12 – 10 || Lilly (8-9) || Sele (6-10) || Batista (16) || 20,516 || 46-47
|- align="center" bgcolor="bbffbb"
| 94 || July 20 || Mariners || 9 – 4 || Chacín (9-5) || Franklin (5-11) || || 28,801 || 47-47
|- align="center" bgcolor="bbffbb"
| 95 || July 21 || Mariners || 6 – 3 || Towers (7-8) || Piñeiro (3-6) || Batista (17) || 26,837 || 48-47
|- align="center" bgcolor="ffbbbb"
| 96 || July 22 || @ Royals || 5 – 3 || Hernández (8-9) || Walker (3-3) || MacDougal (14) || 20,958 || 48-48
|- align="center" bgcolor="bbffbb"
| 97 || July 23 || @ Royals || 9 – 4 || Bush (1-5) || Snyder (0-1) || || 26,626 || 49-48
|- align="center" bgcolor="ffbbbb"
| 98 || July 24 || @ Royals || 6 – 5 || Carrasco (5-4) || Gaudin (1-3) || MacDougal (15) || 10,994 || 49-49
|- align="center" bgcolor="bbffbb"
| 99 || July 26 || Angels || 8 – 0 || Chacín (10-5) || Byrd (9-7) || || 18,754 || 50-49
|- align="center" bgcolor="bbffbb"
| 100 || July 27 || Angels || 3 – 2 (10)|| Batista (5-3) || Donnelly (6-3) || || 18,998 || 51-49
|- align="center" bgcolor="bbffbb"
| 101 || July 28 || Angels || 2 – 1 (18)|| Walker (4-3) || Shields (6-6) || || 19,706 || 52-49
|- align="center" bgcolor="ffbbbb"
| 102 || July 29 || Rangers || 4 – 1 || Brocail (4-2) || Downs (0-2) || Cordero (25) || 21,113 || 52-50
|- align="center" bgcolor="ffbbbb"
| 103 || July 30 || Rangers || 3 – 2 || Benoit (3-1) || Frasor (1-5) || Cordero (26) || 23,039 || 52-51
|- align="center" bgcolor="bbffbb"
| 104 || July 31 || Rangers || 5 – 1 || Chacín (11-5) || Wilson (0-3) || || 24,123 || 53-51
|-

|- align="center" bgcolor="bbffbb"
| 105 || August 2 || @ White Sox || 7 – 3 || Towers (8-8) || Garland (15-5) || || 32,162 || 54-51
|- align="center" bgcolor="bbffbb"
| 106 || August 3 || @ White Sox || 4 – 3 || Bush (2-5) || Hernández (8-4) || Batista (18) || 28,116 || 55-51
|- align="center" bgcolor="ffbbbb"
| 107 || August 4 || @ White Sox || 5 – 4 || Vizcaíno (5-5) || Speier (1-2) || Hermanson (26) || 32,027 || 55-52
|- align="center" bgcolor="ffbbbb"
| 108 || August 5 || Yankees || 6 – 2 || Small (3-0) || Chacín (11-6) || Rivera (28) || 43,688 || 55-53
|- align="center" bgcolor="bbffbb"
| 109 || August 6 || Yankees || 8 – 5 || Walker (5-3) || Johnson (11-7) || || 48,088 || 56-53
|- align="center" bgcolor="ffbbbb"
| 110 || August 7 || Yankees || 6 – 2 || Leiter (2-3) || Towers (8-9) || Rivera (29) || 46,114 || 56-54
|- align="center" bgcolor="ffbbbb"
| 111 || August 8 || Tigers || 9 – 8 (12)|| Darensbourg (1-0) || Schoeneweis (2-3) || Dingman (2) || 20,887 || 56-55
|- align="center" bgcolor="bbffbb"
| 112 || August 9 || Tigers || 6 – 4 || McGowan (1-0) || Douglass (4-2) || Batista (19) || 21,145 || 57-55
|- align="center" bgcolor="bbffbb"
| 113 || August 10 || Tigers || 4 – 3 || Speier (2-2) || Dingman (0-1) || || 24,624 || 58-55
|- align="center" bgcolor="bbffbb"
| 114 || August 11 || Tigers || 2 – 1 || Downs (1-2) || Bonderman (13-9) || Batista (20) || 30,578 || 59-55
|- align="center" bgcolor="bbffbb"
| 115 || August 12 || @ Orioles || 12 – 0 || Towers (9-9) || Cabrera (8-11) || || 29,069 || 60-55
|- align="center" bgcolor="ffbbbb"
| 116 || August 13 || @ Orioles || 1 – 0 || Maine (1-0) || Bush (2-6) || Ryan (26) || 29,445 || 60-56
|- align="center" bgcolor="bbffbb"
| 117 || August 14 || @ Orioles || 7 – 6 || Frasor (2-5) || Byrdak (0-1) || Batista (21) || 30,954 || 61-56
|- align="center" bgcolor="ffbbbb"
| 118 || August 15 || @ Angels || 5 – 4 (11)|| Shields (8-8) || Walker (5-4) || || 38,936 || 61-57
|- align="center" bgcolor="bbffbb"
| 119 || August 16 || @ Angels || 4 – 3 || League (1-0) || Rodríguez (2-3) || Batista (22) || 42,468 || 62-57
|- align="center" bgcolor="bbffbb"
| 120 || August 17 || @ Angels || 4 – 1 || Towers (10-9) || Washburn (6-7) || Batista (23) || 43,026 || 63-57
|- align="center" bgcolor="ffbbbb"
| 121 || August 19 || @ Tigers || 9 – 5 || Maroth (11-11) || Bush (2-7) || Dingman (3) || 32,769 || 63-58
|- align="center" bgcolor="ffbbbb"
| 122 || August 20 || @ Tigers || 3 – 2 (13)|| Germán (4-0) || Batista (5-4) || || 38,073 || 63-59
|- align="center" bgcolor="ffbbbb"
| 123 || August 21 || @ Tigers || 17 – 6 || Douglass (5-2) || McGowan (1-1) || || 36,818 || 63-60
|- align="center" bgcolor="ffbbbb"
| 124 || August 22 || @ Yankees || 7 – 0 || Wright (4-2) || Downs (1-3) || || 50,162 || 63-61
|- align="center" bgcolor="ffbbbb"
| 125 || August 23 || @ Yankees || 5 – 4 || Rivera (6-3) || Batista (5-5) || || 50,528 || 63-62
|- align="center" bgcolor="bbffbb"
| 126 || August 24 || @ Yankees || 9 – 5 || Bush (3-7) || Mussina (12-8) || || 54,705 || 64-62
|- align="center" bgcolor="ffbbbb"
| 127 || August 25 || @ Yankees || 6 – 2 || Chacón (3-1) || Chacín (11-7) || || 54,329 || 64-63
|- align="center" bgcolor="ffbbbb"
| 128 || August 26 || Indians || 9 – 3 || Sabathia (11-9) || McGowan (1-2) || || 24,649 || 64-64
|- align="center" bgcolor="bbffbb"
| 129 || August 27 || Indians || 2 – 1 || Downs (2-3) || Millwood (7-11) || Batista (24) || 27,630 || 65-64
|- align="center" bgcolor="ffbbbb"
| 130 || August 28 || Indians || 4 – 1 || Westbrook (13-13) || Towers (10-10) || Wickman (34) || 31,785 || 65-65
|- align="center" bgcolor="bbffbb"
| 131 || August 30 || Orioles || 7 – 2 || Bush (4-7) || López (13-8) || || 25,311 || 66-65
|- align="center" bgcolor="ffbbbb"
| 132 || August 31 || Orioles || 7 – 0 || Chen (11-8) || Chacín (11-8) || || 24,686 || 66-66
|-

|- align="center" bgcolor="ffbbbb"
| 133 || September 1 || Orioles || 5 – 3 || Penn (3-2) || McGowan (1-3) || Ryan (29) || 20,928 || 66-67
|- align="center" bgcolor="bbffbb"
| 134 || September 2 || Devil Rays || 4 – 3 || Schoeneweis (3-3) || Borowski (1-2) || Batista (25) || 15,108 || 67-67
|- align="center" bgcolor="ffbbbb"
| 135 || September 3 || Devil Rays || 3 – 2 || McClung (6-8) || Batista (5-6) || Báez (32) || 18,841 || 67-68
|- align="center" bgcolor="ffbbbb"
| 136 || September 4 || Devil Rays || 1 – 0 || Kazmir (8-9) || Bush (4-8) || Báez (33) || 20,679 || 67-69
|- align="center" bgcolor="bbffbb"
| 137 || September 5 || @ Orioles || 6 – 2 || Chacín (12-8) || Chen (11-9) || || 22,123 || 68-69
|- align="center" bgcolor="ffbbbb"
| 138 || September 6 || @ Orioles || 5 – 0 || Cabrera (9-11) || Lilly (8-10) || || 20,729 || 68-70
|- align="center" bgcolor="bbffbb"
| 139 || September 7 || @ Orioles || 7 – 4 || Walker (6-4) || Julio (3-5) || Batista (26) || 20,146 || 69-70
|- align="center" bgcolor="bbffbb"
| 140 || September 9 || @ Devil Rays || 7 – 2 || Towers (11-10) || McClung (6-9) || || 10,092 || 70-70
|- align="center" bgcolor="bbffbb"
| 141 || September 10 || @ Devil Rays || 3 – 2 || Bush (5-8) || Báez (5-4) || Batista (27) || 10,984 || 71-70
|- align="center" bgcolor="ffbbbb"
| 142 || September 11 || @ Devil Rays || 6 – 5 (11)|| Harper (3-6) || Schoeneweis (3-4) || || 10,590 || 71-71
|- align="center" bgcolor="ffbbbb"
| 143 || September 12 || Red Sox || 6 – 5 (11)|| Papelbon (1-1) || Walker (6-5) || || 24,617 || 71-72
|- align="center" bgcolor="bbffbb"
| 144 || September 13 || Red Sox || 9 – 3 || Downs (3-3) || Clement (13-5) || || 25,253 || 72-72
|- align="center" bgcolor="ffbbbb"
| 145 || September 14 || Red Sox || 5 – 3 || Wells (13-7) || Towers (11-11) || Timlin (8) || 25,865 || 72-73
|- align="center" bgcolor="ffbbbb"
| 146 || September 16 || Yankees || 11 – 10 || Proctor (1-0) || Bush (5-9) || Rivera (40) || 36,543 || 72-74
|- align="center" bgcolor="ffbbbb"
| 147 || September 17 || Yankees || 1 – 0 || Chacón (5-3) || Chacín (12-9) || Gordon (1) || 43,433 || 72-75
|- align="center" bgcolor="bbffbb"
| 148 || September 18 || Yankees || 6 – 5 || Lilly (9-10) || Wright (5-3) || Batista (28) || 39,891 || 73-75
|- align="center" bgcolor="ffbbbb"
| 149 || September 19 || Mariners || 7 – 5 || Sherrill (4-2) || Batista (5-7) || Guardado (32) || 18,762 || 73-76
|- align="center" bgcolor="bbffbb"
| 150 || September 20 || Mariners || 6 – 4 || Towers (12-11) || Harris (2-5) || Frasor (1) || 19,002 || 74-76
|- align="center" bgcolor="ffbbbb"
| 151 || September 21 || Mariners || 3 – 2 || Hernández (4-4) || Bush (5-10) || Guardado (33) || 21,469 || 74-77
|- align="center" bgcolor="bbffbb"
| 152 || September 22 || Mariners || 7 – 5 || Speier (3-2) || Piñeiro (7-10) || Batista (29) || 23,118 || 75-77
|- align="center" bgcolor="ffbbbb"
| 153 || September 23 || @ Yankees || 5 – 0 || Chacón (6-3) || Lilly (9-11) || || 53,175 || 75-78
|- align="center" bgcolor="bbffbb"
| 154 || September 24 || @ Yankees || 7 – 4 || Downs (4-3) || Wright (5-4) || Batista (30) || 53,911 || 76-78
|- align="center" bgcolor="ffbbbb"
| 155 || September 25 || @ Yankees || 8 – 4 || Wang (8-4) || Towers (12-12) || Rivera (42) || 55,136 || 76-79
|- align="center" bgcolor=#bbbbbb
| -- || September 26 || @ Red Sox ||colspan=6|Postponed (rain) Rescheduled for September 27
|- align="center" bgcolor="ffbbbb"
| 156 || September 27 || @ Red Sox || 3 – 1 || Wakefield (16-11) || Bush (5-11) || Timlin (12) || 35,700 || 76-80
|- align="center" bgcolor="bbffbb"
| 157 || September 27 || @ Red Sox || 7 – 5 || Frasor (3-5) || Bradford (2-1) || Batista (31) || 35,476 || 77-80
|- align="center" bgcolor="bbffbb"
| 158 || September 28 || @ Red Sox || 7 – 2 || Lilly (10-11) || Arroyo (14-10) || || 35,313 || 78-80
|- align="center" bgcolor="ffbbbb"
| 159 || September 29 || @ Red Sox || 5 – 4 || Papelbon (3-1) || Batista (5-8) || || 35,345 || 78-81
|- align="center" bgcolor="bbffbb"
| 160 || September 30 || Royals || 10 – 1 || Towers (13-12) || Greinke (5-17) || || 23,381 || 79-81
|-

|- align="center" bgcolor="ffbbbb"
| 161 || October 1 || Royals || 7 – 6 || Burgos (3-5) || Walker (6-6) || MacDougal (21) || 28,271 || 79-82
|- align="center" bgcolor="bbffbb"
| 162 || October 2 || Royals || 7 – 2 || Chacín (13-9) || Hernández (8-14) || || 37,046 || 80-82
|-

Player stats

Batting

Starters by position
Note: Pos = Position; G = Games played; AB = At bats; H = Hits; Avg. = Batting average; HR = Home runs; RBI = Runs batted in

Other batters
Note: G = Games played; AB = At bats; H = Hits; Avg. = Batting average; HR = Home runs; RBI = Runs batted in

Pitching

Starting pitchers
Note: G = Games pitched; IP = Innings pitched; W = Wins; L = Losses; ERA = Earned run average; SO = Strikeouts

Other pitchers
Note: G = Games pitched; IP = Innings pitched; W = Wins; L = Losses; ERA = Earned run average; SO = Strikeouts

Relief pitchers
Note: G = Games pitched; W = Wins; L = Losses; SV = Saves; ERA = Earned run average; SO = Strikeouts

Award winners
Vernon Wells, Gold Glove Award
All-Star Game
 Roy Halladay, pitcher
 Shea Hillenbrand, designated hitter

Farm system

References

External links
2005 Toronto Blue Jays team page at Baseball Reference
2005 Toronto Blue Jays team page at www.baseball-almanac.com

Toronto Blue Jays seasons
Toronto Blue Jays season
Toronto Blue Jays
2005 in Toronto